The traditional geographic regions of Greece are the country's main historical-geographic regions, and were also official administrative regional subdivisions of Greece until the 1987 administrative reform. Despite their replacement as first-level administrative units by only partly identical administrative regions, the nine traditional geographic regions—six on the mainland and three island groups—are still widely referred to in unofficial contexts and in daily discourse.

, the  official administrative divisions of Greece consist of 13 regions—nine on the mainland and four island groups—which are further subdivided into 74 regional units and 325 municipalities. Formerly, there were also 54 prefectures or prefectural-level administrations.

See also 
 Regions of ancient Greece

Notes 

Geography of Greece
Geographic

Regions

de:Griechenland#Politische Gliederung